Capanema is a municipality in the state of Paraná in the South Region of Brazil.

References

Municipalities in Paraná